The 2014–15 UTSA Roadrunners men's basketball team represented the University of Texas at San Antonio during the 2014–15 NCAA Division I men's basketball season. The Roadrunners, led by ninth year head coach Brooks Thompson, played their home games at the Convocation Center and were members of Conference USA. They finished the season 14–16, 8–10 in C-USA play in a 4 way tie for seventh place. They lost in the first round of the C-USA tournament to FIU.

Previous season
The Roadrunners finished the season 11–22, 4–12 in C-USA play to finished the season 8–22, 4–12 in C-USA play to finish in a tie for fourteenth place. They lost in the first round of the C-USA tournament to East Carolina.

Departures

Incoming Transfers

Class of 2014 recruits

Roster

Schedule

|-
!colspan=9 style="background:#E74F00; color:#00438C;"| Exhibition
 
|-
!colspan=9 style="background:#E74F00; color:#00438C;"| Regular season

|-
!colspan=9 style="background:#E74F00; color:#00438C;"| Conference USA tournament

References

UTSA Roadrunners men's basketball seasons
UTSA
UTSA Roadrunners
UTSA Roadrunners